Xincun Hui Ethnic Township (Xiao'erjing: سٍڞٌ خُوِذُو سِیْا)  is a township-level division situated in Huanghua, Cangzhou, Hebei, China.

See also
List of township-level divisions of Hebei

References

Township-level divisions of Hebei
Ethnic townships of the People's Republic of China